Mateusz Ponitka (born August 29, 1993) is a Polish professional basketball player for Panathinaikos of the Greek Basket League and the EuroLeague. He also represents the senior Polish national basketball team in international competitions.

His brother Marcel Ponitka is also a professional basketball player who capped for the Polish national team.

Professional career

Early years
Ponitka started playing basketball in UKS Kasprowiczanka Ostrow Wielkopolski, before moving in 2009 to AZS Warsaw University of Technology. In his first season as a professional player, he appeared in 27 games of the Polish 2nd-tier League, averaging 7.1 points, 3.5 rebounds and 1.2 steals in 18 minutes per game. He also appeared in four games of the Polish Cup, averaging 9 points per game. In September 2010, Ponitka took part in the Basketball Without Borders camp, held in Barcelona. He was named the MVP of the camp.

In the 2010–11 season, he had bigger role in the team, which reflected on his stats. In April 2011, he took part in Nike Hoop Summit held in Portland, Oregon. He was the leading scorer of the World Select Team with 17 points in a 92–80 loss to the USA Team. Over the season, he averaged 11.7 points, 4.7 rebounds and 1.6 steals over 34 games. His team eventually won the championship, this way promoting to the Polish League in the following season.

In the 2011–12 season, due to his good performances, he was voted for the Polish League All-Star game with the most votes. In the game, he was the third scorer in his team with 13 points. In his final season with AZS Warsaw University of Technology, he averaged 13.6 points and 4.6 rebounds.

Asseco Prokom
On March 27, 2012, Ponitka signed a three-year deal with the Polish team Asseco Prokom. He also had an option to leave the team after two seasons. In the new team, his minutes were very limited, and the player had the averages of 2.6 points and 1.4 rebounds for the rest of the season. However, his team won the Polish League championship, by defeating Trefl Sopot with 78-67 in the final series. In the 2012–13 season, his role in the team increased, as he averaged 8.6 points and 4.2 rebounds per game over the season. He also played in the EuroLeague, averaging 8.8 points and 3.5 rebounds over 10 games.

Telenet Oostende
On August 4, 2013, he signed a three-year contract with the Belgian team Telenet Oostende. In the 2013–14 season, his team won the Belgian League championship.

He went undrafted in the 2015 NBA draft.

Zielona Góra
On August 4, 2015, he signed a contract with the Polish team Stelmet Zielona Góra. Ponitka was named the EuroCup Rising Star of the 2015–16 season.

Pınar Karşıyaka
On August 8, 2016, he signed a two-year deal with Turkish club Pınar Karşıyaka.

Lokomotiv Kuban
On July 13, 2018, he signed with Russian club Lokomotiv Kuban.

Zenit
On July 4, 2019, Ponitka signed a two-year contract with BC Zenit Saint Petersburg.

Pallacanestro Reggiana
On August 17, 2022, he signed a three-month deal with an option until the end of the season with Reggio Emilia of the Italian Lega Basket Serie A (LBA).

Panathinaikos
On September 23, 2022, Ponitka signed a one-year deal with Panathinaikos of the Greek Basket League and the EuroLeague.

National team career
Ponitka was part of the Poland U-17 national basketball team which took the silver medal at the 2010 FIBA Under-17 World Championship held in Germany. In the final game he scored 14 points against the United States, but his team lost by huge margin, 111–80. He played against athletes like Bradley Beal, Michael Kidd-Gilchrist, James Michael McAdoo, Andre Drummond, Quinn Cook, Marquis Teague and others. He was named to the All-Tournament Team.

In 2011, he was part of the U-18 team which took sixth place at the 2011 FIBA Europe Under-18 Championship held in Poland. Over 9 tournament games, he averaged 15.3 points and 7.6 assists per game.

He officially debuted for the senior national team on August 3, 2012 in the friendly game against Montenegro. Even he played for nearly 23 minutes, he scored just 4 points. He was a member of the team at the 2013 FIBA EuroBasket held in Slovenia. He averaged 3.6 points and 1.4 rebounds over 5 tournament games.

He represented the Polish national team at the 2015 FIBA EuroBasket and 2017 FIBA EuroBasket. He also participated in the 2019 FIBA World Cup, where he scored 26 points against China. Down 1, Ponitka came up with a key steal on Chinese star Zhou Qi with 3 seconds left, being fouled in the process and sending the game into overtime, where Poland would later triumph in an upset 79-76 overtime win over the hosts.

Ponitka played at EuroBasket 2017, where he averaged 12.8 points and 7.2 rebounds per game, while Poland did not advance past the preliminary round.

Ponitka returned at EuroBasket 2022 for Poland. In the quarter-finals against heavily favoured Slovenia, he guided Poland to a 90–87 upset win to reach the first semifinals in 51 years. Ponitka finished with 26 points, 16 rebounds and 10 assists to become the fourth player in EuroBasket history to record a triple-double.

Career statistics

EuroLeague

|-
| style="text-align:left;"| 2012–13
| style="text-align:left;"| Asseco Prokom
| 10 || 4 || 22.2 || .486 || .323 || .381 || 3.5 || .8 || 1.0 || .0 || 8.8 || 7.8
|-
| style="text-align:left;"| 2015–16
| style="text-align:left;"| Zielona Góra
| 10 || 10 || 31.5 || .505 || .250 || .676 || 7.9 || 2.2 || 1.1 || .2 || 12.0 || 17.9
|- class="sortbottom"
| colspan=2 align=center | Career
| 20 || 14 || 26.8 || .497 || .294 || .564 || 5.7 || 1.5 || 1.1 || .1 || 10.4 || 12.8

National team

See also
Sport in Poland
List of Polish basketball players

References

External links

 
 Mateusz Ponitka at draftexpress.com
 Mateusz Ponitka at eurobasket.com
 Mateusz Ponitka at euroleague.net
 Mateusz Ponitka at fiba.com
 Mateusz Ponitka at fiba.basketball

1993 births
Living people
2019 FIBA Basketball World Cup players
Asseco Gdynia players
Basket Zielona Góra players
BC Oostende players
BC Zenit Saint Petersburg players
CB Canarias players
Karşıyaka basketball players
Liga ACB players
Pallacanestro Reggiana players
Panathinaikos B.C. players
PBC Lokomotiv-Kuban players
People from Ostrów Wielkopolski
Polish expatriate basketball people in Belgium
Polish expatriate basketball people in Greece
Polish expatriate basketball people in Italy
Polish expatriate basketball people in Spain
Polish expatriate basketball people in Turkey
Polish men's basketball players
Small forwards
Sportspeople from Greater Poland Voivodeship